Nils Ragnar Moritz (born 5 May 1943 in Tallinn, Estonia) is a Swedish actor.

Selected filmography
1987 - En film om kärlek
1988/1989 - Dårfinkar & dönickar (TV)
1989 - Ture Sventon, privatdetektiv (TV, Julkalendern)
1991 - Ture Sventon och fallet Isabella
1992 - Hassel – Botgörarna
1993 - Sune's Summer
1994 - Bert (TV series)
1995 - Tre Kronor (TV series)
1996 - Rederiet (TV)
1997 - Beck – Pensionat Pärlan
1999 - Vuxna människor
2001 - Jordgubbar med riktig mjölk
2002 - Livet i 8 bitar
2005 - Lasermannen (TV series)
2005 - Wallander – Mörkret
2006 - LasseMajas detektivbyrå (TV series)
2007 - Lögnens pris (TV)
2008 - De halvt dolda (TV)

References

External links

Male actors from Tallinn
Swedish male actors
Living people
1943 births